Subterranean Records is an independent record label based in San Francisco, California. Founded by Steve Tupper and a then partner, Michael Fox in 1979, it focused on that city's underground punk and industrial music scene.

Subterranean and fellow punk/alt/underground San Francisco label Alternative Tentacles both sprang forth from the DIY punk movement in 1979, and were quite successful on college and community radio stations in the US. These labels helped define the San Francisco punk movement. Subterranean was the more avant garde of the two. While originally just focused on documenting and promoting the SF area, over the years Subterranean has released records by artists from many areas and genres.  Like many small DIY labels, Steve Tupper noted that bands were chosen based on his musical tastes.

Subterranean had a small storefront record shop on Valencia Street for about 4 years, from about 1984 to 1988.

The label has released a number of important underground albums, most notably four LPs by the band Flipper. The Dead Kennedys also released an important single on the label.

Catalog
This list is organized by catalog number, a roughly chronological number system established by the label and typically printed on or assigned to each official release.
{|class="wikitable"
! Year
! No.
! Artist
! Title
! Co-releases & Re-releases
|-
| style="text-align:center;"|1979
| style="text-align:center;"|SUB01
|Various Artists
|SF Underground (7" EP)
|
|-
| style="text-align:center;"|1980
| style="text-align:center;"|SUB02
|Society Dog
|Working Class People (7" EP)
|
|-
| style="text-align:center;"|1980
| style="text-align:center;"|SUB03
|Various Artists
|Live At Target (LP)
|
|-
| style="text-align:center;"|1980
| style="text-align:center;"|SUB04
|The Jars
|Start Rite Now (7" single)
|
|-
| style="text-align:center;"|1980
| style="text-align:center;"|SUB05
|Bay Of Pigs
|Addiction / Aliens (7" single)
|
|-
| style="text-align:center;"|1980
| style="text-align:center;"|SUB06
|Tools
|Hard Wark / The Road Forever (7" single)
|
|-
| style="text-align:center;"|1981
| style="text-align:center;"|SUB07
|Flipper
|Love Canal / Ha Ha Ha (7" single)
|
|-
| style="text-align:center;"|1981
| style="text-align:center;"|SUB08
|Various artists
|Club Foot (LP)
|
|-
| style="text-align:center;"|1980
| style="text-align:center;"|SUB09
|No Alternative
|Backtracks (7" single)
|
|-
| style="text-align:center;"|1980
| style="text-align:center;"|SUB10
|Various Artists
|S.F. Underground 2 (7" EP)
|
|-
| style="text-align:center;"|1981
| style="text-align:center;"|SUB11
|Tools
|#3 E.P. (7" EP)
|
|-
| style="text-align:center;"|1981
| style="text-align:center;"|SUB12
|Ultrasheen
|City Boy (7" EP)
|
|-
| style="text-align:center;"|1981
| style="text-align:center;"|SUB13
|Society Dog
|...Off Of The Leash (7" EP)
|
|-
| style="text-align:center;"|1981
| style="text-align:center;"|SUB14
|Stefan Weisser
|Poextensions & Contexts (7" single)
|
|-
| style="text-align:center;"|1983
| style="text-align:center;"|SUB14-2
|Stefan Weisser
|Editeditions Contexts (7" single)
|
|-
| style="text-align:center;"|1981
| style="text-align:center;"|SUB15
|Various Artists
|Red Spot (LP)
|
|-
| style="text-align:center;"|1981
| style="text-align:center;"|SUB16
|Various Artists
|Arizona Disease (7" EP)
|
|-
| style="text-align:center;"|1981
| style="text-align:center;"|SUB17
|The Witch Trials
|The Witch Trials (LP)
|Alternative Tentacles & New Rose Records
|
|-
| style="text-align:center;"|1981
| style="text-align:center;"|SUB18
|Minimal Man
|The Shroud Of (LP)
|
|-
| style="text-align:center;"|1981
| style="text-align:center;"|SUB19
|Pre Fix
|Underneathica / Ectomorphine (7" single)
|
|-
| style="text-align:center;"|1981
| style="text-align:center;"|SUB20
|Inflatable Boy Clams
|Inflatable Boy Clams (2x7" EP)
|
|-
| style="text-align:center;"|1981
| style="text-align:center;"|SUB21
|Nervous Gender
|Music From Hell (LP)
|
|-
| style="text-align:center;"|1981
| style="text-align:center;"|SUB22
|Wilma
|Pornography Lies (7" single)
|
|-
| style="text-align:center;"|1981
| style="text-align:center;"|SUB23
|Flipper
|Sexbomb / Brainwash (7" single)
|
|-
| style="text-align:center;"|1981
| style="text-align:center;"|SUB24
|Dead Kennedys
|Nazi Punks Fuck Off! / Moral Majority (7" single)
|Alternative Tentacles
|
|-
| style="text-align:center;"|1981
| style="text-align:center;"|none
||Factrix Cazazza
|Night Of The Succubus (VHS)
|
|-
| style="text-align:center;"|1982
| style="text-align:center;"|SUB25
|Flipper
|Album Generic Flipper (LP)
|
|-
| style="text-align:center;"|1982
| style="text-align:center;"|SUB26
|Factrix Cazazza
|California Babylon (LP)
|
|-
| style="text-align:center;"|1982
| style="text-align:center;"|SUB27
|Code Of Honor / Sick Pleasure
|Fight Or Die / Dolls Under Control (LP)
|
|-
| style="text-align:center;"|1982
| style="text-align:center;"|SUB28
|Tom Tadlock
|Body Ad / Poker Keno (7" single)
|
|-
| style="text-align:center;"|1986
| style="text-align:center;"|SUB29
|Stefan Weisser
|Life Sentence — An uns Retrospective (cassette box)
|
|-
| style="text-align:center;"|1982
| style="text-align:center;"|SUB30
|Z'EV
|Elemental Music (LP)
|
|-
| style="text-align:center;"|1982
| style="text-align:center;"|SUB31
|Chrome
|Box (5xLP)
|Cleopatra Records 
|
|-
| style="text-align:center;"|1983
| style="text-align:center;"|SUB32
|Negative Trend
|Negative Trend (aka: We Don't Play We Riot 12") (7" EP)
|2.13.61 Records
|
|-
| style="text-align:center;"|1985
| style="text-align:center;"|SUB33
|Z'EV
|My Favorite Things (LP)
|
|-
| style="text-align:center;"|1982
| style="text-align:center;"|SUB34
|Chrome
|Anorexic Sacrifice (7" single)
|
|-
| style="text-align:center;"|1982
| style="text-align:center;"|SUB35
|Flipper
|Get Away (7" single)
|
|-
| style="text-align:center;"|1982
| style="text-align:center;"|SUB36
|Code Of Honor
|What Are We Gonna Do? (7" single)
|
|-
| style="text-align:center;"|1983
| style="text-align:center;"|SUB37
|Tana Emmolo-Smith / Joseph T. Jacobs
|Prescient Dreams / Zanoni (7" single)
|
|-
| style="text-align:center;"|1983
| style="text-align:center;"|SUB38
|Lose
|What’s Your Name? / Waking To Sleep (7" single)
|
|-
| style="text-align:center;"|1983
| style="text-align:center;"|SUB39
|Sick Pleasure
|Sick Pleasure (7" EP)
|
|-
| style="text-align:center;"|1983
| style="text-align:center;"|SUB40
|The Leather Nun
|Prime Mover (7" single)
|Scabri Records
|
|-
| style="text-align:center;"|1983
| style="text-align:center;"|SUB41
|Arkansaw Man
|Every Job (7" single)
|
|-
| style="text-align:center;"|1983
| style="text-align:center;"|UR 3996
|Minimal Man
|Two Little Skeletons / Tired Death (7" single)
|
|-
| style="text-align:center;"|1984
| style="text-align:center;"|SUB42
|Flipper
|Gone Fishin' (LP)
|Fundamental Records, Domino Recording Company
|
|-
| style="text-align:center;"|1984
| style="text-align:center;"|SUB43
|Code Of Honor
|Beware The Savage Jaw (LP)
|
|-
| style="text-align:center;"|1984
| style="text-align:center;"|SUB44
|Pop-O-Pies
|Joe's Second Record (12" EP)
|
|-
| style="text-align:center;"|1984
| style="text-align:center;"|SUB45
|Longshoremen
|Grr Huh Yeah (LP)
|
|-
| style="text-align:center;"|1984
| style="text-align:center;"|SUB46
|Frightwig
|Cat Farm Faboo (LP)
|
|-
| style="text-align:center;"|1985
| style="text-align:center;"|SUB47
|Rod Myers & The Ramps / The Corvettes
|Wheelchair / Maybellene (7" single)
|
|-
| style="text-align:center;"|1985
| style="text-align:center;"|SUB48
|Psyclones
|Psyclones (LP)
|
|-
| style="text-align:center;"|1985
| style="text-align:center;"|SUB49
|Helios Creed
|X-Rated Fairy Tales (LP)
|Fundamental Records, Lilith Records
|
|-
| style="text-align:center;"|1985
| style="text-align:center;"|SUB50
|Wilma
|Wilma (LP)
|
|-
| style="text-align:center;"|1985
| style="text-align:center;"|SUB51
|The Muskrats
|Rock Is Dead (LP)
|
|-
| style="text-align:center;"|1985
| style="text-align:center;"|SUB52
|Pop-O-Pies
|Joe's Third Record (LP)
|
|-
| style="text-align:center;"|1986
| style="text-align:center;"|SUB53
|Flipper
|Public Flipper Limited (2xLP)
|Domino Recording Company, Fundamental Records
|
|-
| style="text-align:center;"|1986
| style="text-align:center;"|SUB54
|Longshoremen
|Walk The Plank (LP)
|Eva Records
|
|-
| style="text-align:center;"|1986
| style="text-align:center;"|SUB55
|Polkacide
|Polkacide (LP)
|
|-
| style="text-align:center;"|1986
| style="text-align:center;"|SUB56
|Controlled Bleeding
|Core (LP)
|Ultra-Mail Prod.
|
|-
| style="text-align:center;"|1987
| style="text-align:center;"|SUB57
|Any Three Initials
|Ruins Of America (EP)
|MEKA Records
|
|-
| style="text-align:center;"|1987
| style="text-align:center;"|SUB58
|The Muskrats
|Soul Francisco (EP)
|
|-
| style="text-align:center;"|1987
| style="text-align:center;"|SUB59
|Flipper
|Sex Bomb Baby (LP)
|Domino Recording Company
|
|-
| style="text-align:center;"|1987
| style="text-align:center;"|SUB60
|Low Flying Aircraft
|Low Flying Aircraft (LP)
|Red Hot Records, Core Records
|
|-
| style="text-align:center;"|1988
| style="text-align:center;"|SUB61
|Housecoat Project
|Wide Eye Doo Dat (LP)
|
|-
| style="text-align:center;"|1989
| style="text-align:center;"|SUB62
|Helios Creed
|Superior Catholic Finger (LP)
|Lilith Records
|
|-
| style="text-align:center;"|1987
| style="text-align:center;"|SUB63
|Penelope Houston
|Birdboys (EP)
|Round Tower Records
|
|-
| style="text-align:center;"|1989
| style="text-align:center;"|SUB64
|Terminators Of Endearment
|Stranger In The Manger (7" single)
|
|-
| style="text-align:center;"|1989
| style="text-align:center;"|SUB65
|Various Artists
|Devouring Our Roots (LP)
|
|-
| style="text-align:center;"|2010
| style="text-align:center;"|SUB66
|Housecoat Project
|Girlfiend (LP)
|
|-
| style="text-align:center;"|1990
| style="text-align:center;"|SUB67
|Controlled Bleeding
|Hog Floor (A Fractured View) (LP)
|
|-
| style="text-align:center;"|1989
| style="text-align:center;"|SUB68
|Various Artists
|Dry Lungs IV (LP)
|
|-
| style="text-align:center;"|1990
| style="text-align:center;"|SUB69
|Caroliner Rainbow Stewed Angel Skins
|I'm Armed With Quarts Of Blood (LP)
|
|-
| style="text-align:center;"|1990
| style="text-align:center;"|SUB70
|Flipper
|Some Day / Distant Illusion (7" single)
|
|-
| style="text-align:center;"|1992
| style="text-align:center;"|SUB71
|Kathleen Yearwood
|Dead Branches Make A Noise (LP)
|Voice Of The Turtle Records
|
|-
| style="text-align:center;"|1992
| style="text-align:center;"|SUB72
|Various Artists
|Dry Lungs V (2xCD)
|
|-
| style="text-align:center;"|1992
| style="text-align:center;"|SUB74
|Angel'in Heavy Syrup
|Angel'in Heavy Syrup (CD)
|
|-
| style="text-align:center;"|2008
| style="text-align:center;"|SUB75
|Caroliner Rainbow Susans And Bruisins
|The Cooking Stove Beast (CD)
|Nuf Sed Records
|
|-
| style="text-align:center;"|1996
| style="text-align:center;"|SUB76
|Kathleen Yearwood
|Little Misery Birds (EP)
|Voice Of The Turtle Records
|
|-
| style="text-align:center;"|2001
| style="text-align:center;"|SUB77
|The Lewd
|Lewd Conduct In A Public Place! (LP)
|
|-
| style="text-align:center;"|2005
| style="text-align:center;"|SUB78
|Code Of Honor
|Complete Studio Recordings 1982-1984 (CD)
|
|}

Roster
 
 Alterboys
 Angel'in Heavy Syrup
 Animal Things
 Any Three Initials
 Arkansaw Man
 Arsenal
 Bay of Pigs
 The Bedlam Rovers
 Caroliner
 Chrome
 Club Foot Orchestra
 Code of Honor
 Controlled Bleeding
 Dead Kennedys
 Factrix
 Flipper
 Fried Abortions
 Frightwig
 Helios Creed
 Housecoat Project
 Penelope Houston
 Inflatable Boy Clams
 The Jars
 Jr. Chemists
 The Leather Nun
 Les Seldoms
 The Lewd
 Bruce Loose
 Low Flying Aircraft
 Minimal Man
 The Muskrats
 Naked City
 Negative Trend
 Nervous Gender
 No Alternative
 Polkacide
 Pop-O-Pies
 Pre-Fix
 Psyclones
 Research Library
 Sick Pleasure
 Society Dog
 Tom Tadlock
 The Terminators of Endearment
 The Tools
 Ultrasheen
 UNS
 VKTMS
 The Wannabe Texans
 Stefan Weisser
 Wilma
 Witch Trials
 Woundz
 Kathleen Yearwood
 Z'ev

See also
 List of record labels

References

External links
 Subterranean Records Homepage
 Discography at Discogs.com

Record labels established in 1979
American independent record labels
Punk record labels
Industrial record labels
Music of the San Francisco Bay Area